The Derby City Distaff Stakes is a Grade I American thoroughbred horse race for fillies and mares aged three and older over a distance of seven furlongs on the dirt held annually in early May on the Kentucky Derby day meeting at Churchill Downs in Louisville, Kentucky during the spring meeting.  The current purse is $500,000.

History

The event was inaugurated on May 2, 1987 as the fifth race on the undercard of the Kentucky Derby day meeting as the Brown & Williamson Handicap sponsored by the tobacco company Brown & Williamson, which at the time had their headquarters in Louisville.

The event was a Listed race until 1990 when it was upgraded to Grade III status. It was subsequently upgraded to a Grade II event in 1999 then to its present Grade I status in 2002.

The event's name was changed in 1995 to the Humana Distaff Handicap, sponsored by Humana, an American health insurance company also based in Louisville, Kentucky. In 2007, the event was changed to the Humana Distaff Stakes, and is now run under allowance weight conditions. Humana last year of sponsorship was 2019, with Churchill Downs finding new sponsorship in 2020 with Derby City Gaming.

The first five runnings of the event the winners were ridden by US Hall of Fame jockey Pat Day.
Pat Day won another two more runnings of this event before retiring in 2005. In 2015, Churchill Downs renamed the Derby Trial in his honor as the Pat Day Mile which is held on the same day as this event.

Of the more notable winners of this race include 2012 winner Groupie Doll who set a new track record at Churchill Downs for the 7 furlong distance in a time of 1:20.44 and would later that year win the Breeders' Cup Filly & Mare Sprint and be crowned the US Champion Female Sprint Horse.

Records
Speed record
 1:20.44 – Groupie Doll (2012)

Margins 
  lengths – Groupie Doll (2012)

Most wins
 No horse has won this race more than once.

Most wins by a jockey
 7 – Pat Day (1987, 1988, 1989, 1990, 1991, 2001, 2004)

Most wins by a trainer
 2 – Claude R. McGaughey III  (1991, 1994)
 2 – Bob Baffert (2006, 2014)
 2 – Simon Callaghan (2016, 2018)

Most wins by an owner:
 2 – Juddmonte Farms (2003, 2017)
 2 – Michael E. Pegram (2006, 2014)

Winners

Notes:

† In the 2002 running, Gold Mover won the race but was disqualified and placed second after stewards ruled she had bumped and interfered with Celtic Melody near the eighth pole.

See also
 Humana Distaff Handicap "top three finishers" and starters
 List of graded stakes at Churchill Downs
 List of American and Canadian Graded races

References

Grade 1 stakes races in the United States
Flat horse races for four-year-old fillies
Sprint category horse races for fillies and mares
Recurring sporting events established in 1987
Churchill Downs horse races
1987 establishments in Kentucky